Pitalito is a Colombian town and municipality located to the south of the Department of Huila, Colombia over the Valley of the Rio Grande de la Magdalena, 188 km from Huila's capital, Neiva. It is referred to as "The Valley of Laboyos" and is also the second most populated municipality in the Department of Huila, with approximately 135,000 inhabitants. Pitalito is considered the largest producer of coffee in Colombia. Being at the epicenter of the coffee producing the District of Bruselas, the town has become a notable coffee-growing area within Colombia. On several occasions, it has been awarded with the "Cup of Excellence", for producing the best coffee in the country.

The boundaries are Timaná, Elias and Saladoblanco to the North, Palestina to the south, Isnos and San Agustín to the west, and Acevedo to the east.

History 
In 1818, José Hilario Sierra was appointed Catholic priest of the vice-parish of "Los Laboyos". That year, a few residents of the Laboyos decided to move their homes to Pitalito, a picturesque site two miles to the northeast. Early settlers were attracted to Pitalito because of its fertility, mild climate, the abundance of water, and the ready availability of construction materials.

More residents followed in the same year to emigrate, causing rapid depopulation of Laboyos. Eventually, almost all of its inhabitants moved to Pitalito in the Cálamo estate. The adjacent Solarte estate already had more than two thousand cattle and horses.

Dr. Sierra, seeing that his parishioners were dispersed, decided, under his Ministry, to follow them to Pitalito. He built a hut-chapel where he could administer the Holy Sacraments and celebrate Holy Mass. The chapel, the first in the area, still stands today in the same location as the Temple of San Antonio. In 1819, Dr. Sierra demarcated the square and the streets of the new town in front of the chapel.

After three years and with a growing community, the new village needed a mayor. Don Jorge de Cuéllar, son of Don Luis de Cuéllar, an important figure in the town of Timaná, was appointed to the post. Don Luis was one of the owners of the region and was of noble lineage, being the son of Don Jerónimo de Cuéllar, whose family originated in the kingdoms of Spain, in Andalusia.

Coffee

Colombia Supremo 17/18 Pitalito 
Colombia is the third largest producer of coffee in the world and the largest producer of washed and Arabica coffee. The country is well known for its high-quality coffee and about half of its exports are sent to the United States. Colombia exports approximately 12.5 million bags and domestic consumption is about 2 million bags annually.

Colombia only produces Arabica coffee, mostly washed. There are three prominent varieties grown in Colombia and the coffee is referred to by the region in which it is grown. There are many coffee producing regions in the country.  Washed Arabica coffee comes from the town of Pitalito, which lies in southern Huila in the Valley of Laboyos. This southern area of Colombia is at the foot of the Andes mountains. This massive mountain range is the birthplace of the Magdalena River, which travels north to the Caribbean coast.

The valley itself lies at about 1,300 meters above sea level. All the surrounding mountains grow coffee with the average farm having about 6 hectares and about 5,000 trees per hectare. The soil is volcanic, providing plenty of organic nutrients for the high altitude coffee.

Cup Characteristics 
Colombia Pitalito is recognized for having high acidity, medium to good body, and stone fruit notes.

Arabica variety: Caturra and Castillo

Harvest period: October–February

Aroma: Caramel

Flavor: Sweet, Stone fruit, Caramel

Body: Medium body

Acidity: High citric acidity

Tourism 
San Agustin Archaeological Park is located 30 miles from Pitalito. This site was declared a UNESCO World Heritage Site in 1995. The site contains the largest collection of religious monuments and megalithic sculptures in Latin America and is considered the world's largest necropolis. Pitalito has the closest airport to San Agustin with flights to Bogota and Cali with the airline SATENA.

Hotels 
Pitalito has several hotels, including Hotel Grand Premium Plaza, Hotel Napoles, Hotel Hostal Ullumbe, Hotel Calamo, Hotel Interescorial, and Hotel Guaitipan Plaza.

Restaurants 
Pitalito has a variety of restaurants, Food and liquor Pitalito, Arte Burger - Pitalito, Pizza Pitalito, Archopi, Burger restaurant; Pure Love, Bar; La Casa en el Aire, Bar & Grill; Le Bistro 450, restaurant; Restaurante El Caporal; Salu, Restaurant/Cafe; and Sufy, Ice cream & restaurant.

References

External links
 Official government website

Municipalities of Huila Department